Ying-Ying Hui (1928-1993) is a former Chinese actress from Hong Kong. Hui is credited with over 310 films.

Career 
In 1952, Hui became a Chinese actress in Hong Kong films. Hui first appeared in A Bright Future, a 1952 Comedy and Cantonese opera directed by Chun Kim. Hui appeared in Cantonese opera, Drama, Comedy, and Martial arts films. In Drama, Hui appeared in films such as A Mother's Tears (1953) and Spring's Flight (1954). In Cantonese opera, Hui appeared in films such as General Kwan Seduced by Diaochan Under Moonlight (aka Kwan-Ti, God of War)(1956) and as Mu-Lan's elder sister in Hua Mulan, the Girl Who Went to War (1957). In Martial arts films, Hui appeared in films such as Seven Swordsman Leave Tianshan (1959), Green Dragon Sword (1961), Blood No. 1 (aka The Ring of Spies)(1965), and The Dead and the Deadly (1982). In Comedy, Hui appeared in films such as Chicken and Duck Talk (1988) and How to Be a Millionaire (aka How to Be a Billionaire Without Really Trying) (1989). Hui's last film was All's Well End's Well, Too, a 1993 Comedy film directed by Clifton Ko Chi-Sum. Hui is credited with over 310 films.

Filmography

Films 
This is a partial list of films.
 1952 A Bright Future
 1953 A Mother's Tears 
 1954 Spring's Flight - Maid
 1956 General Kwan Seduced by Diaochan Under Moonlight (aka Kwan-Ti, God of War)
 1957 Hua Mulan, the Girl Who Went to War - Mu-Lan's elder sister
 1959 Seven Swordsman Leave Tianshan 
 1961 Green Dragon Sword 
 1963 The Face of Fear (aka The Priceless Souvenir)
 1965 Blood No. 1 (aka The Ring of Spies)
 1967 A Girl's Secret 
 1967 Bunny Girl - Second daughter-in-law. 
 1967 Finding a Wife in a Blind Way - Lucy.
 1967 Rocambole 
 1967 The Story of a Discharged Prisoner - Ah Hon's wife.
 1970 Yesterday, Today, Tomorrow 
 1981 Wedding Bells, Wedding Belles 
 1982 The Dead and the Deadly
 1982 Tiger Killer 
 1982 Wild Cherry 
 1988 Chicken and Duck Talk - Maria 
 1989 How to Be a Millionaire (aka How to Be a Billionaire Without Really Trying)

Personal life 
Hui had three children. In 1993, Hui died in Singapore.

References

External links 
 Ying-Ying Hui at imdb.com
 Hui Ying Ying at hkcinemagic.com
 Hui Ying Ying at letterboxd.com
 Hui Ying Ying at moviena.com
 Hui Ying-ying at senscritique.com

1928 births
1993 deaths
Hong Kong film actresses